Turn Blue may refer to:

"turn blue", the catchphrase of Ghoulardi
Turn Blue (album), 2014 album by The Black Keys
"Turn Blue" (The Black Keys song), title track from above album
"Turn Blue", song by Iggy Pop on Lust for Life
"Turn Blue" (instrumental), 1965 single by Jimmy McGiff